The Chief of the General Staff of the Army of North Macedonia is the professional head of the North Macedonian military, responsible for the administration and the operational control.

History
Eleven people served as Chief of the General Staff since the independence of North Macedonia from Yugoslavia. The first Chief was Major general Mitre Arsovski (appointed on 16 March 1992), and the current Chief is Lt. Col. General Vasko Gjurčinovski (appointed on 18 August 2018).

The shortest-serving Chief of the General Staff was General Pande Petrovski (about 3 months), and the longest-serving was Lt. Col. General Miroslav Stojanovski (over 6 years)

List of chiefs of the general staff
Chiefs of the General Staff have been:

See also
 Army of North Macedonia

Notes

References

External links
 Previous chiefs of the General Staff of the Army of the Republic of North Macedonia 
 Chief of the General Staff of the Army of the Republic of North Macedonia 

Military of North Macedonia
North Macedonia